George Green was a unionist politician in Northern Ireland.

Biography
Green was the chairman of the Ulster Special Constabulary Association (USCA), a group which focussed on opposition to the Irish Republican Army.  He was elected to North Down Borough Council in 1973 as an independent loyalist.

At the 1973 Northern Ireland Assembly election, Green stood in North Down for the Vanguard Unionist Progressive Party, but he was not elected.  Through his role in the USCA, he was a prominent leader of the Ulster Workers' Council strike, and was able to gain election to the Northern Ireland Constitutional Convention.  Soon after, he left Vanguard to join the United Ulster Unionist Party split, but this was collapsing by 1980, and Green instead joined James Kilfedder's Ulster Popular Unionist Party, for which he very narrowly missed being elected to the Northern Ireland Assembly, 1982.

Green left the Popular Unionists, and was re-elected at the 1985 local elections for the Ulster Unionist Party, then in 1989 and 1993 for the Conservatives in Northern Ireland, standing down in 1997.

References

Year of birth missing (living people)
Living people
Members of North Down Borough Council
Members of the Northern Ireland Constitutional Convention
Vanguard Unionist Progressive Party politicians
United Ulster Unionist Party politicians
Ulster Unionist Party councillors
Conservative Party (UK) politicians
Independent politicians in Northern Ireland